Vicky Cristina Barcelona is a 2008 romantic comedy-drama film written and directed by Woody Allen. The film stars Javier Bardem, Penélope Cruz, Rebecca Hall and Scarlett Johansson in lead roles. The plot centers on two American women, Vicky and Cristina, who spend a summer in Barcelona, where they meet an artist, Juan Antonio, who is attracted to both of them, while still enamored of his mentally and emotionally unstable ex-wife María Elena. The film was shot in Spain in Barcelona, Avilés, and Oviedo, and was Allen's fourth consecutive film shot outside the United States.

Vicky Cristina Barcelona premiered at the 2008 Cannes Film Festival, and then received a rolling worldwide general release that started on August 15, 2008, in the United States, and continued in various countries until its June 2009 release in Japan. The film emerged as a commercial success at the box office, becoming one of Allen's highest-grossing films. It received widespread critical acclaim upon release, with particular praise directed towards Cruz's performance.

At the 66th Golden Globe Awards, Vicky Cristina Barcelona received 4 nominations, including Best Actor – Musical or Comedy (Bardem), Best Actress – Musical or Comedy (Hall) and Best Supporting Actress (Cruz), and won Best Film – Musical or Comedy. Cruz also won both the Academy Award and BAFTA Award for Best Supporting Actress, in addition to a Screen Actors Guild Award nomination in the same category.

Plot
Vicky and Cristina visit Barcelona for the summer, staying with Vicky's distant relative Judy and her husband Mark. While the two are great friends, Vicky is practical and traditional in her approach to love and commitment and is engaged to the reliable Doug, whereas Cristina imagines herself to be a nonconformist, spontaneous but unsure of what she wants from life or love.

At an art exhibition, Cristina is intrigued by artist Juan Antonio, who Judy says has suffered a violent relationship with his ex-wife. Later, he brazenly approaches Vicky and Cristina to invite them to join him right away for the weekend in the city of Oviedo, in a small plane he flies himself, for sight-seeing, fine eating and drinking, and hopefully, lovemaking. Cristina is won over by the offer almost at once, but Vicky is unimpressed and reluctant; she, however, eventually decides to accompany her friend anyway, mainly to watch over her.

At the end of their first day, Vicky refuses to join Juan Antonio in his hotel room, citing her fidelity to Doug, but Cristina accepts his invitation immediately. Before the lovemaking starts, Cristina suddenly falls ill with digestive complaints, and is put to bed, with food poisoning. Vicky and Juan Antonio proceed to spend the weekend together alone while they wait for Cristina to recuperate. Vicky gradually changes her opinion of Juan Antonio as he tells her about his tumultuous relationship with his former wife, María Elena. Vicky accompanies him to visit his father, an old poet, and then becomes deeply moved by a Spanish guitar performance later that evening. She finally succumbs to Juan Antonio's advances as they walk through a grove of trees in the dark. The next day, with Cristina recovered, the three of them fly back to Barcelona.

Feeling guilty, Vicky does not mention the incident to Cristina, and the two begin to grow apart. Vicky starts throwing herself into her studies while Cristina and Juan Antonio take up a relationship. Cristina then moves in with Juan Antonio and begins to discover more about his past. After learning that María Elena attempted to kill herself, Juan Antonio takes her to his home, where Cristina already lives. After some defiance, the two women grow fond of each other. Cristina realizes that the ex-spouses are still in love, and María Elena suggests that Cristina may be the element that can give balance and stability to their relationship. All three become romantically involved with one another.

In the meantime, Vicky is joined in Spain by an enthusiastic Doug and the two get married. When Cristina describes her new life with Juan Antonio to Vicky, Vicky becomes secretly jealous, and after a few other awkward moments, she realizes she is unsatisfied in her married life and is still attracted to Juan Antonio. Learning that Judy is similarly unhappy in her marriage, she confides to her, and Judy, who sees her younger self in Vicky, decides to bring Juan Antonio and Vicky together. Meanwhile, Cristina becomes restless and at some point decides to leave Juan Antonio and María Elena; without her, their relationship quickly falls apart again.

As the summer winds to a close, Judy arranges for Juan Antonio and Vicky to meet at a party. Juan Antonio begs Vicky to meet him again privately before leaving Spain, which she finally accepts, lying to Doug in the process. At his home, Juan Antonio seduces and wins Vicky over again, but they are interrupted by María Elena who bursts in with a gun, firing wildly as Juan Antonio tries to calm her. Vicky gets shot in the hand in the process, and leaves, shouting they are insane and she could never live like this. She confesses the entire story to Cristina, who never realized how Vicky felt about Juan Antonio, and wishes she could have helped her. Doug, Vicky and Cristina return to the United States; Doug never learns what truly happened, Vicky goes back to her married life, and Cristina is back where she started, still unsure of what she wants from life or love.

Cast

Spanish actor Joan Pera, who dubbed Allen's voice in the Spanish-language versions of his previous films, makes a cameo appearance.

Production
In 2007, controversy arose in Catalonia over the public funding granted to the film, as the high-profile film was presumed not to have needed it; Barcelona's city hall provided one million euro and the Generalitat de Catalunya (Government of Catalonia) half a million, or ten percent of the film's budget.

This was the third time Allen and Johansson had worked together, following Match Point (2005) and Scoop (2006). This also marked the second time Hall and Johansson had worked together, the first time being in The Prestige (2006).

The film featured several paintings by Catalan artist Agustí Puig and included several examples of the work of architect Antoni Gaudí, including his Park Güell.

Reception

Box office
, the film grossed $96 million worldwide; in relation to its $15 million budget, it is one of Allen's most profitable films.

Critical response
Vicky Cristina Barcelona garnered the best reviews Allen received since his Academy Award-nominated psychological thriller Match Point (also starring Johansson) (2005), particularly for Cruz's performance. The film has an approval rating of 81% on Rotten Tomatoes based on 212 reviews, with an average score of 6.90/10. The site's consensus reads: "A beguiling tragicomedy, Vicky Cristina Barcelona charms with beautiful views of the Spanish city and a marvelously well-matched cast".  Metacritic assigned the film a weighted average score of 70 out of 100, based on 36 critics, indicating "generally favorable reviews".

Scott Tobias wrote in The A.V. Club that it was "a witty and ambiguous film that's simultaneously intoxicating and suffused with sadness and doubt." Richard Roeper suggested that Cruz should receive an Academy Award nomination for her performance in the film. Mick LaSalle of the San Francisco Chronicle praised the film as "the work of a confident and mature artist", referring to Allen. Manohla Dargis of The New York Times wrote "Although Vicky Cristina Barcelona trips along winningly, carried by the beauty of its locations and stars — and all the gauzy romanticism those enchanted places and people imply — it reverberates with implacable melancholy, a sense of loss." Richard Corliss ended his review of the film with "Vicky Cristina Barcelona has neither the sardonic heft of Max Ophüls's La Ronde (1950) nor the emotional precision of Ingmar Bergman's Smiles of a Summer Night (1955), two films that also dance the change-partners gavotte. But the film is so engaging so much of the time that it feels like a modest rejuvenation: evidence that a summer in Spain can do wonders for a writer-director who may not have outlived his prime." S. Williams of Momzone magazine singled out Johansson's performance for praise, writing, "Johansson's acting is syrup: fluid and sweet." Ian Freer of Empire gave the film 4 out of 5, and wrote "within Allen's recent output, Vicky Cristina Barcelona is a highlight. See it for beautiful locales, an ambivalent look at human relationships and a clutch of great performances, particularly from Cruz."

Accolades
The film appeared on many critics' top-ten lists of the best films of 2008 including;

 5th – David Denby, The New Yorker
 5th – Ray Bennett, The Hollywood Reporter
 5th – Bob Mondello, NPR
 7th – Joe Morgenstern, The Wall Street Journal
 7th – Keith Phipps, The A.V. Club
 7th – Kyle Smith, New York Post
 7th – Steve Rea, The Philadelphia Inquirer
 8th – Mick LaSalle, San Francisco Chronicle
 9th – Carrie Rickey, The Philadelphia Inquirer
 10th – Michael Sragow, The Baltimore Sun

Awards and nominations

References

External links

 Vicky Cristina Barcelona at The Numbers

2000s English-language films
2000s Spanish-language films
2008 comedy-drama films
2008 LGBT-related films
2008 films
2008 romantic comedy-drama films
American LGBT-related films
American romantic comedy-drama films
American multilingual films
Asturias in fiction
BAFTA winners (films)
Best Musical or Comedy Picture Golden Globe winners
English-language Spanish films
English-language Catalan films
Female bisexuality in film
Films about fictional painters
Films about threesomes
Films about vacationing
Films directed by Woody Allen
Films featuring a Best Supporting Actress Academy Award-winning performance
Films featuring a Best Supporting Actress Goya Award-winning performance
Films produced by Gareth Wiley
Films produced by Letty Aronson
Films produced by Stephen Tenenbaum
Films set in Barcelona
Films shot in Barcelona
Films with screenplays by Woody Allen
LGBT-related romantic comedy-drama films
Metro-Goldwyn-Mayer films
Oviedo
Spanish multilingual films
Spanish LGBT-related films
Spanish romantic comedy-drama films
The Weinstein Company films
Films shot in Asturias
2000s American films
2000s Spanish films